Chaetofoveolocoris is a genus of plant bugs in the family Miridae. There are at least two described species in Chaetofoveolocoris.

Species
These two species belong to the genus Chaetofoveolocoris:
 Chaetofoveolocoris hirsutus (Knight, 1968)
 Chaetofoveolocoris parsoni Schwartz, 1989

References

Further reading

 
 
 

Miridae genera
Articles created by Qbugbot
Stenodemini